Al-Akirshi or Uqayrishah is a Syrian village in the Raqqa District in Raqqa Governorate. According to the Syria Central Bureau of Statistics (CBS), Al-Akirshi had a population of 4,304 in the 2004 census.

References

Populated places in Raqqa District